Mikko Tapani Lehtonen (born 12 June 1978) is a Finnish former ice hockey defenceman. He played 15 games in the National Hockey League with the Nashville Predators during the 2006–07 season. The rest of his career, which lasted from 1999 to 2014, was mainly spent with Kärpät in the Finnish SM-liiga. Internationally Lehtonen played for the Finnish national team at the 2006 and 2009 World Championships, winning a bronze in 2006.

Playing career 
Lehtonen appeared in his first National Hockey League game on 7 October 2006 with the Nashville Predators against the Minnesota Wild, and registered his first NHL goal in that game. The goal was scored eight seconds into his first NHL shift, coming one second short of tying the all-time record set by Dave Christian.

On 27 February 2007, Lehtonen was traded to the Buffalo Sabres for a fourth-round pick in the 2007 NHL Entry Draft.

Having won the Finnish Championship for a third time playing for Oulun Kärpät, Lehtonen signed a one-year deal with Swedish team Timrå IK on 9 June 2008.

On 6 May 2009, Lehtonen signed with Frölunda HC for the 2009–10 Frölunda HC season.

Career statistics

Regular season and playoffs

International

References

External links 
 

1978 births
Living people
Finnish ice hockey defencemen
Frölunda HC players
Milwaukee Admirals players
Nashville Predators players
Oulun Kärpät players
People from Kiiminki
Rochester Americans players
Sportspeople from North Ostrobothnia
Timrå IK players